The Roman Catholic Archdiocese of Resistencia is in Argentina and is a metropolitan diocese.  Its suffragan sees include Formosa and San Roque de Presidencia Roque Sáenz Peña.

History
On 3 June 1939, Pope Pius XII established the Diocese of Resistencia from the Archdiocese of Santa Fe.  It lost territory to the Diocese of Formosa when it was created in 1957 and to the Diocese of Presidencia Roque Sáenz Peña in 1961.  The Diocese of Resistencia was elevated to an archdiocese by Pope John Paul II on 28 February 1984.

Ordinaries
Nicolás de Carlo (1940–1951)
Enrique Rau (1954–1957)
José Agustín Marozzi (1957–1984)
Juan José Iriarte (1984–1991)
Carmelo Juan Giaquinta (1993–2005) - Archbishop Emeritus
Fabriciano Sigampa (2005–present)

Territorial losses

External links and references

Roman Catholic dioceses in Argentina
Roman Catholic Ecclesiastical Province of Resistencia
Christian organizations established in 1939
Roman Catholic dioceses and prelatures established in the 20th century
1939 establishments in Argentina